Flying Saucer Tour Vol. 1 is a live performance album by American stand-up comedian and satirist Bill Hicks, released by Rykodisc in 2002. Unlike his other albums, where the crowds have generally been fairly receptive and accepting of his act, this album is notable for the negative (or lack of) reaction Hicks receives throughout most of the album.

Track 4 of the album contains an additional joke at the end of the track that does not appear on the video version of the same title.

Track listing
"Intro" - 0:26
"Summertime" - 2:49
"The F Word" - 0:42
"Smoking" - 2:01
"Yul Brynner" - 1:25
"Trying to Quit" - 4:56
"The News" - 1:00
"The War" - 3:45
"Worst Audience Ever" - 1:03
"More War" - 2:14
"Are You Guys Drug Dealers?" - 1:50
"Praying for Nuclear Holocaust" - 1:10
"Girl of Your Dreams" - 2:16
"Young Lady" - 1:26
"Vs. the Audience 1" - 0:51
"What's Wrong?" - 1:53
"Vs. the Audience 2" - 4:40
"School Days" - 3:18
"Vs. the Audience 3" - 1:16
"Working" - 1:15
"Great Times on Drugs" - 7:11
"Mandatory Marijuana" - 4:49
"Penthouse Letters" - 2:48
"Talking Car" - 3:38
"Summer Trip" - 2:20
"Drugs Have Done Good Things" - 3:10
"Menu?" - 1:28
"Beelzebozo" - 1:36
"Cause of Sexual Thought" - 4:08
"Mechanics of Pornography" - 3:09
"Goodnight" - 0:44

References

Bill Hicks albums
Live albums published posthumously
2002 live albums
Rykodisc live albums
2000s comedy albums
Live comedy albums
Spoken word albums by American artists
Live spoken word albums
Stand-up comedy albums